Kachinamthoduka Puthiyapurayil Ummer  known as K. P. Ummer was an Indian actor from Thekkepuram quarter of Kozhikode, Kerala, India. He was active in the Malayalam cinema from early sixties until late nineties.

He was born to T. Mohamed Koya and Beevi on 11 October 1930 in Calicut. His first film was Rarichan Enna Pauran (1956). He frequently played the villain opposite Prem Nazir, who played the hero. Ummer was also a character artist in the 1960s, 1970s and 1980s. In 1967, he did his first character role in the film Udhyogastha directed by P. Venu. Later he had worked in many of his films.

Ummer was a professional drama actor of K.P.A.C. and other troupes. He was a brilliant football player.

K. P. Ummer was the first actor in Kerala to turn down a state government award. The K. P. Ummer Anusmarana Samithi created an award instituted in his memory  for the people who contribute to Malayalam movies.

Filmography

 1998 – Harikrishnans as Hostel Warden
 1997 – The Car as Advocate 
 1995 - Keerthanam as Father Pulikkottil
 1995 – Mannar Mathai Speaking as Prathapa Varma  
 1995 – Sundarimare Sookshikkuka
 1994 – Minnaram as Chackochan 
 1994 – Chanakya Soothrangal as Madhavan Nair
 1993 –  Butterflies
 1993 – Acharyan 
 1991 – Nayam Vyakthamakkunnu 
 1991 – Adayalam as Mr. Menon 
 1990 – Varthamana Kalam as K. P. Menon 
 1990 – Arhatha as Sreedharan Unnithan 
 1990 – Midhya as Nambiar 
 1990 – Iyyer The Great 
 1990 – Niyamam Entu Cheyyum
 1990 – Kshanakathu
 1990 – Kadathanadan ambadi
 1989 – Jaithra Yathra as Nair
 1989 – Maharajavu
 1988 – Dhwani as Omalloor Sadasivan 
 1988 – Orkkappurathu as Chacha  
 1988 – 1921 
 1988 – Ormayil Ninnum as Doctor
 1988 – Sankhanadam
 1988 – Dheerkha Sumgali Bava
 1987 – Swargam
 1987 – Kilipattu
 1987 – Mangalya Charthu as MRG Menon
 1987 – Adimakal Udamakal as Andrews 
 1986 – Iniyum Kurukshethram as Krishnan Menon 
 1986 – Sayam Sandhya 
 1986 – Ennennum Kannettante 
 1986 – Shyama as Menon 
 1986 – Shobharaj
 1986 – Moonu Masalgalkku Munpu
 1986 – Mansiloru Manimuthu
 1985 – Oru Naal Innoru Naal as Thampi
 1985 – Ithu Nalla Thamasa as'Meesha' Vasu Pillai
 1985 – Ivide Ee Theerathu
 1985 - Angadikkappurathu as Dasappan
 1984 – Panchavadi Palam as Jahangir 
 1984 – Mangalam Nerunnu
 1984 – Manase Ninakku Mangalam as Raghunath 
 1984 – Lakshmana Rekha as Col. Rajasekharan Nair 
 1984 – Ivide Thudangunnu as Pappachan 
 1984 – Athirathram as Shankardas 
 1984 – Ulpathi
 1984 – Nishedi as Madhavan Thampi
 1984 – Ivide Thudagunnu as Pappachan 
 1984 – Veruthe Oru Pinakkam
 1984 – Ente Kalithozhan
 1984 – Poomadathe Pennu
 1984 – Uyarangalil
 1984 – Pavam Krooran
 1984 – Nokkathaa Dhoorathu Kannum Nattu as Mathews
 1984 – Ente Nandinikuttikku
 1983 – Onnu Chirikku as Govindankutty 
 1983 – Naanayam as Thambi 
 1983 – Eettappuli as Pareed
 1983 – Karyam Nissaram as Avarachan 
 1983 – America America as R. K. Menon  
 1983 – Bandam
 1983 – Kodumkattu
 1983 – Pourusham
 1983 – Shesham Kazhchayil
 1983 – Thimigalam as Menon
 1983 – Manassoru Mahasamudram
 1983 – Sandhyavandanam
 1983 – Surumayitta Kannukal
 1982 – Ente Mohangal Poovaninju 
 1982 – Arambam as Khader
 1982 – Madrasile Mon
 1982 – Thudakkam Odukkam
 1982 – Shila
 1982 – Chambalkadu as Govind Singh
 1982 – Aayudham
 1982 – Chilanthivala as Menon
 1982 – Saram
 1982 – Dheera
 1982 – Beedikunjamma as Sankara Pilla
 1981 – Theekkali as Sankarankutti 
 1981 – Druvasangamam as Krishna Das 
 1981 – Valarthu Mrugangal as Gopi 
 1981 – Sanchari as Mammad
 1981 – Sphodanam 
 1981 – Sahasam 
 1981 – Chatta
 1981 – Oothikachiya Ponnu (1981) as Mathachan
 1981 – Ashtamikkatha Pakalukal
 1981 – Parankimala
 1981 – Thadavara as S. P. Chandrasekhar
 1981 – Sambhavam
 1981 – Kolilakkam 
 1980 – Lava as Rajasekharan  
 1980 – Aagamanam as Divakaran 
 1980 – Shalini Ente Koottukari as Shalini's Father
 1980 – Dooram Arike
 1980 – Kaavalmaadam as Kollapanikkar
 1980 – Pralayam
 1980 – Swargadevatha
 1980 – Digvijayam as Vishwambaran
 1980 – Ishtamanu Pakshe
 1980 – Ammayum Makalum
 1980 – Kochu Kochu Thettukal
 1980 – Ashwaradham
 1979 – Angakkuri as Thampi
 1979 – Aavesham as Raghavan  
 1979 – Krishnaparundu
 1979 – Indradhanussu
 1979 – College Beauty
 1979 – Yakshiparu
 1979 – Ente Neelakasham
 1979 – Jimmy as Thomas
 1979 – Ival Oru Nadodi
 1979 - Indradhanussu as Menon
 1979 – Pushyaragam
 1979 – Valeduthavan Valal
 1979 – Vijayam Nammude Senani
 1979 – Kathirmandapam
 1979 – Maani Koya Kuruppu
 1979 – Irumbazhikal as Chandran
 1979 – Avesham
 1979 – Agnivyooham
 1979 – Avano Atho Avalo as Mohan
 1978 – Thacholi Ambu
 1978 – Yagaswam
 1978 – Vilakkum Velichavum
 1978 – Prema Shilpi
 1978 – Hemantarathri
 1978 – Bashpeekaranam
 1978 – Kadathanattu Makkam
 1978 – Sthree Oru Dukam
 1978 – Ashtamudikayal
 1978 – Aasramam
 1978 – Ee Ganam Marakkumo
 1978 – Nivedyam
 1978 – Kanalkattakal as James/Rajan
 1978 – Samayamayilla Polum
 1978 – Anuboothikalude Nimisham
 1978 – Orkuka Vellapozhum
 1978 – Manoradham
 1978 – Veluvili
 1978 – Azhi Alayazhi
 1978 – Ithe Oru Manushyan as Inspector
 1978 – Ee Manohara Theeram as Sankaran
 1978 – Aalmarattam (P. Venu)
 1978 – Society Lady
 1978 – Vishwaroopam
 1978 – Raju Rahim
 1977 – Kannappanunni as Chandu
 1977 – Itha Ivide Vare as Vasu
 1977 – Acharam Ammini Osaram Omana as Nalukettil Sivan Pillai  
 1977 – Neethipeedam
 1977 – Hridayame Sakshi
 1977 – Muttathe Mulla as Panikkar
 1977 – Chakravarthini
 1977 – Karnaparvam
 1977 – Aparadhi as Johnson
 1977 – Niraparayum Nilavilakkum
 1977 – Akshyapatram
 1977 – Kaduvaye Pidicha Kiduva
 1977 – Saritha
 1977 – Yatheem as Kunjahammed
 1977 – Anugraham as Sreedhara Menon
 1977 – Veedu Oru Swargam
 1977 – Anthardaham
 1977 – Sujatha
 1977 – Harshbashppam
 1977 – Amme Anupame
 1977 – Yudhakandam
 1977 – Tholkkan Eniku Manasilla
 1977 – Ashirvadam
 1977 – Oonjal as Bhaskara Menon
 1977 – Angeekaram as Madhava Menon
 1977 – Ivanente Priya Puthran
 1976 – Alinganam as Gopinath
 1976 – Ammini Ammavan
 1976 – Abhinandanam
 1976 – Yudhabhoomi
 1976 – Missy
 1976 – Ajayanum Vijayanum
 1976 – Yakshaganam as Venu
 1976 – Mallanum Mathevanum
 1976 – Ozhukkinethire
 1976 – Rajankanam
 1976 – Rathriyile Yathrakkar (P. Venu)
 1976 – Kenalum Collectorum
 1976 – Mohiniyattam
 1976 – Vanadevatha as Lohithakshan
 1976 – Rajayogam
 1976 – Appoppan
 1976 – Chennaya Valarthiya Kutty
 1976 – Ayiram Janmagal as Sukumaran
 1976 – Nee Ente Lahari
 1976 – Kuttavum Shikshayum
 1975 – Cheenavala
 1975 – Babumon as Rajagopal
 1975 – Velicham Akale
 1975 – Boy Friend (P. Venu)
 1975 – Penpada as Raghavan
 1975 – Madhurapathinezhu
 1975 – Love Marriage as Raju
 1975 – Kuttichathan
 1975 – Ulsavam as Vasu
 1975 – Chattambikkalyaani as Vaasu
 1975 – Palazhi Madanam
 1975 – Padmaragam
 1975 – Thiruvonam
 1975 – Kottaram Vilkkanundu
 1975 – Ashtamirohini
 1975 – Chief Guest
 1975 – Sathyathinte Nizhal
 1975 – Thamarathoni
 1975 - Alibabayum 41 Kallanmarum as Sherkhan
 1975 – Neela Ponman as Pavithran
 1975 – Manishada
 1975 – Criminals (Kayangal)
 1974 – Pancha Thanthram as Prof Menon 
 1974 – Nellu as Joseph 
 1974 – Ashwathi
 1974 – Nadanmare Avashyamundu 
 1974 – Ayalathe Sundari as Dhamodaran 
 1974 – Raja Hamsam
 1974 – Shapa Moksham
 1974 – Bhoomidevi Pushpiniyayi as Madhava Menon
 1974 – College Girl as Kunjahammed Hajiyar
 1974 – Arakallan Mukkakallan
 1974 – Ayalathe Sundari
 1974 – Thumbolarcha as Elamannur Madathil Chandu
 1974 – Thacholi Marumakan Chandu as Kandarar Menon
 1974 – Durga
 1974 – Panchathandram as Menon
 1974 – Ankathattu
 1973 – Ladies' Hostel as Gopi
 1973 – Panchavadi as Babu
 1973 – Driksashi as Raghunath
 1973 – Kapalika as Nair/Alex 
 1973 – Jesus
 1973 – Badradeepam as Manager Prakashan
 1973 – Thenaruvi
 1973 – Thaniniram as Tank Madhavan
 1973 – Football Champion as Ravi
 1973 – Manassu
 1973 – Maram as Khadar
 1973 – Police Ariyaruthu as Cheriyan
 1973 – Kattu Vithachavan
 1973 – Ithu Manushyano?
 1973 – Divya Darshanam as Rajashekharan
 1973 – Ponnapuram Kotta
 1973 – Kavitha
 1973 – Pavangal Pennugal
 1973 – Thiruvabharanam
 1972 – Achanum Bappayum as Musthafa
 1972 – Aromalunni
 1972 – Mayiladumkunnu
 1972 – Kalipava
 1972 – Sambhavami Yuge Yuge as Raju
 1972 – Anantashayanam
 1972 – Nadanpremam
 1972 – Azhimugam
 1972 – Nirthashala as Jayadevan
 1972 – Oru Sundariyude Kadha as Engineer
 1972 – Postmane Kaanmanilla as Madhu
 1972 – Akkarapacha
 1972 – Maya as Vasutty
 1972 – Balya Prathijna
 1971 – Oru Penninte Katha  (1971)
 1971 – Line Bus as Chandrasenan
 1971 – C.I.D. Nazir (P. Venu) 
 1971 – Rathri Vandi as Willy
 1971 – Thapaswini
 1971 – Achante Bharya as Vijayan
 1971 – Vithukal as Chandran
 1971 – Agni Mrigam
 1971 – Kari Nizhal
 1971 – Muthassi
 1971 – Shiksha as Prabhakaran/Rajan
 1971 – Yogamullaval
 1971 – Panchavan Kaadu as Marthanda Varma
 1971 – Anubavagal Palichakal
 1971 – Thettu as Mathew
 1971 – Lanka Dahanam as Sekharan
 1971 – Lora
 1971 – Vivaha Sammanam
 1970 – Vazhve Mayam as Sasidaharan Nair 
 1970 – Sarasvathi
 1970 – Anadha
 1970 – Raktha Pushpam
 1970 – Thara as Gopinathan Nair
 1970 – Detective 909 Keralathil (P. Venu)
 1970 – Nizhalattom
 1970 - Vivahitha as Suresh
 1970 – Ningalenne Communistakki as Mathew
 1970 – Pearl View as Professor Stephen
 1970 – Ezhuthatha Kadha
 1970 – Othenante Makan
 1970 – Dathuputhran as Jose
 1970 – Lottery Ticket as S R Menon
 1970 – Nishagandhi
 1970 – Ambalapravu
 1970 – Aranazhika Neram as Thomas
 1969 – Danger Biscut as Dr.Sudhakaran
 1969 – Rahasyam as Prasad
 1969 – Vilapetta Bandangal
 1969 – Kattukurangu
 1969 – Kannur Deluxe as Venu
 1969 – Chattambikavala
 1969 – Mooladanam as Madhusudhanan Pilla
 1969 – Rest House as Balan
 1969 – Mister Kerala
 1969 – Ballatha Pahayan as Rajan
 1969 – Urangatha Sundary as Sudhakaran
 1969 – Kadalpalam as Prabhakaran
 1969 – Padicha Kallan 
 1969 – Sandhya
 1969 – Virunnukari as Surendran
 1969 – Kallichellamma
 1969 – Vilakuranja Manushyar
 1968 – Thokkukal Katha Parayunnu (1968)
 1968 – Chitra Mela(segment "Nagarathinte Mukhangal") (1967)
 1968 – Vazhi Pizhacha Santhathi
 1968 – Karthika as Bharathan
 1968 – Bharyamar Sookshikkuka as Dr Sreedhara Poduval
 1968 – Inspector
 1968 – Kadal as Lazar
 1968 – Lakshaprabhu
 1968 – Kayalkarayil
 1968 – Vidhyarthi
 1968 – Padunna Puzha as Ravindran Nair
 1968 – Agnipareeksha as Gopal
 1968 – Love In Kerala as Sankar
 1967 – Ulathumathi
 1967 – Postman
 1967 – Chitramela
 1967 – Udhyogastha (P. Venu)
 1967 – Nagarame Nandi
 1967 – Khadeeja
 1967 – Aval
 1967 – Madatharuvi
 1967 – Kanatha Veshangal
 1966 – Karuna 
 1966 – Archana as Gopi
 1966 – Station Master
 1966 – Manikya Kottaram
 1966 – Tharavattamma as Suresh
 1966 – Kayamkulam Kochunni as Diwan
 1965 – Murappennu as Aniyan
 1965 – Daham as Sukumar
 1962 – Swargaraajyam 
 1960 – Umma as Hameed
 1956 – Rarichan Enna Pauran

References

External links

http://en.msidb.org/displayProfile.php?category=actors&artist=KP%20Ummer&limit=317

Male actors from Kozhikode
Kerala State Film Award winners
1934 births
2001 deaths
Male actors in Malayalam cinema
Indian male film actors
20th-century Indian male actors